Arkansas Highway 25 is a northeast–southwest state highway in north central Arkansas. The route runs  from US 64 in Conway to US 63/412 in Black Rock through Greers Ferry, Batesville, and the foothills of The Ozarks.

Route description

AR 25 begins in Conway at US 64. Near Conway, it is strictly a local route with no direct access to Interstate 40. A I-40 exit west of AR 25 is marked as AR 25 North, but the road serving it is officially called US 64 Spur; its junction with US 64 is 0.7 mile west of AR 25.

From Conway, the road runs north to Wooster, where it turns northeast, meeting US 65 in Greenbrier. The route overlaps US 65 for several miles north of Greenbrier, then continues northeast, meeting AR 107 and AR 225 before entering Quitman. AR 25 continues diagonally northeast, meeting AR 16 and Little Rock Road near Heber Springs. A business loop and two spur routes both serve Heber Springs. AR 25 continues north with AR 5, a partnership named Heber Springs Road, until AR 5 departs at Wolf Bayou.  AR 87 joins AR 25 in nearby Concord.

Entering Independence County, AR 25 meets AR 14 in Locust Grove. The route meets US 167 just north of the Batesville Municipal Airport in south Batesville. In central Batesville, AR 25 (here concurrent with US 167) meets AR 69 before exiting town headed due east. AR 122 meets AR 25 near Cord, after which it begins heading north. AR 25 runs north until AR 230 in Strawberry, followed by a meeting and concurrency with AR 361 from Lynn to Black Rock. In Black Rock, AR 25 ends at US 63 and US 412.

Except where it coincides with U.S. 65 at Greenbrier and U.S. Highway 167 at Batesville (both undivided four-lane segments), and certain passing lanes, (mostly between Greenbrier and Heber Springs), it is entirely a two-lane highway.  This hilly, curvy road is useful for those seeking the towns and recreational areas along it, mainly in the Greers Ferry Lake area.

History
The segment between Conway and Wooster is a former route of U.S. 65.

In 1982 this road was redesignated as the anomalous U.S. Highway 412. Major towns along the road include Walnut Ridge and Paragould. This section through the cotton country of eastern Arkansas was flat and largely straight, except where it passed through Crowley's Ridge west of Paragould. Its eastern terminus was then the Missouri state line at the St. Francis River, where it continued as Missouri Route 25 toward Kennett, Missouri.

Some sources continue to claim that Highway 25 ends at US 67/AR 34 at Walnut Ridge.  Though this was the original west end of U.S. 412 when established in 1982 from Highway 25 east of Walnut Ridge, it was later extended west across Arkansas along the former Black Rock-Walnut Ridge segment of Highway 25 (including its concurrency with U.S. 63 from Black Rock to Portia), thus truncating Highway 25 at Black Rock where it meets the present U.S. 63-412 concurrency.

Major intersections

Special routes

See also

References

External links

025
Transportation in Faulkner County, Arkansas
Transportation in Cleburne County, Arkansas
Transportation in Independence County, Arkansas
Transportation in Lawrence County, Arkansas
U.S. Route 65
Conway, Arkansas